Last Bullet Memorial, located at Bandırma district of Balıkesir represents last bullets of Turkish War of Independence.

History 
Last conflict happened at Ayyıldız Tepe and last bullet fired at this place made Turkish victory decisive. 80 soldiers, including Regiment Commander Vecihibey became martyrs here. In 50th anniversary of Republic talks started for a memorial for martyrs of Turkish War of Independence and an association was formed in Bandırma. Prof. Dr. Gündüz Özdeş, a city planner from Istanbul Technical University planned a project and first phase of it, crossed guns memorial part was built with economic help from Bandırma citizens and ministry in 1974. Eight guns represent last bullets fired that showed the victory is represented, won against enemies and guns are no longer needed.

References

Monuments and memorials to the Turkish War of Independence
Balıkesir
1974 sculptures